John David Cairns (10 February 1925 – 25 January 2014) was an English cricketer. He played seven first-class matches for Oxford University Cricket Club between 1946 and 1949. After becoming a doctor he spent most of the rest of his life in Canada. He and his wife Mary had two daughters.

See also
 List of Oxford University Cricket Club players

References

External links
 
 

1925 births
2014 deaths
English cricketers
Oxford University cricketers
Gibraltarian cricketers
Free Foresters cricketers
Alumni of Balliol College, Oxford